Vincent Taua (born 1 November 1978) is a New Caledonian footballer who plays as a attacker for Campli. Besides France, he has played in Italy.

Career

Taua started his career with French fifth tier side Bastia B. In 2001, Taua signed for Cavese in the Italian third tier, where he made 10 league appearances and scored 1 goal. In 2002, he signed for Italian fourth tier club Isernia.

In 2003, Taua signed for Teramo in the Italian third tier. In 2009, he returned to Italian fifth tier team Teramo. In 2010, he signed for Isernia. In 2014, he signed for Piano della Lente in the Italian sixth tier. In 2020, Taua signed for Italian seventh tier outfit Campli.

Personal life

He is the cousin of France international Christian Karembeu.

References

External links
 

1978 births
A.S.G. Nocerina players
Association football forwards
Benevento Calcio players
Cavese 1919 players
Eccellenza players
Expatriate footballers in France
Expatriate footballers in Italy
Isernia F.C. players
Living people
New Caledonian expatriate footballers
New Caledonian footballers
Nuorese Calcio players
Paganese Calcio 1926 players
Serie C players
Serie D players
S.S. Teramo Calcio players
U.S. Vibonese Calcio players